Tony Finnigan (born 17 October 1962) is an English retired professional footballer who made nearly 200 appearances in the Football League. He was born in Wimbledon. After retirement he became a players agent in partnership with Ian Wright and Andy Gray. He is also the partner of Stan Collymore in a television production company.

In his capacity as a players' agent, he has attracted controversy for supporting disgraced footballer Marlon King following the latter's criminal convictions.

References

External links 
 
 
 http://www.holmesdale.net/page.php?id=82&story=1021

1962 births
Living people
Footballers from Wimbledon, London
English footballers
England youth international footballers
Association football midfielders
Fulham F.C. players
Corinthian-Casuals F.C. players
Hendon F.C. players
Crystal Palace F.C. players
Blackburn Rovers F.C. players
Hull City A.F.C. players
Swindon Town F.C. players
Brentford F.C. players
Sea Bee players
Barnet F.C. players
Enfield F.C. players
Falkirk F.C. players
English Football League players
Scottish Football League players
Isthmian League players
British sports agents